Estonia competed at the 2003 World Championships in Athletics.

Medalists

World Championships in Athletics
2003
Nations at the 2003 World Championships in Athletics